The 15th constituency of Budapest is one of the single member constituencies of the National Assembly, the national legislature of Hungary. The constituency standard abbreviation: Budapest 15. OEVK.

Since 2018, it has been represented by Ágnes Kunhalmi of the MSZP-Dialogue party alliance.

Geography
The 15th constituency is located in south-easthern part of Pest.

List of districts
The constituency includes the following municipalities:

 District XVIII.: Full part of the district.

Members
The constituency was first represented by László Kucsák of the Fidesz from 2014 to 2018. Ágnes Kunhalmi of the MSZP was elected in 2018.

References

Budapest 15th